Holiday Snapshots is a 1999 photography collection of black and white and color images by British photographer David Hamilton, continuing his interest in adolescent girls, nudity and erotica.  The book includes an introduction by Liliane James and captions by James and Hamilton's ex-wife Gertrude Hamilton.

The book contains many images previously unpublished from sessions dating back to the 1970s and 1980s, not only Hamilton's formal portraits, but also candid images of his models indoors and poolside, diving, leaping, stretching, playing or sunbathing. Thus there is a much greater variety of poses here than in previous books. The book is published by Edition Olms, and has three hundred and forty photos over two hundred and fifteen pages.

Holiday Snapshots received a limited distribution because it was privately printed and intended to be sold primarily via Hamilton's now defunct website, Hamilton-Archives.com.

Along with two of Hamilton's other photography books, Twenty Five Years of an Artist and Private Collection, Holiday Snapshots are banned in New Zealand. Not all of Hamilton's works are banned in New Zealand; Dreams of a Young Girl and The Age of Innocence, for example, remain unrestricted.

Familiar photos included
 Summer stock-- the super sale! Adge 1876
 Pearldiver, Morca 1976

References

1999 non-fiction books
Books of nude photography
Book censorship in New Zealand